Søren Byder (born 20 July 1972) is a retired Danish actor.

Career
 Bella min Bella (1996)
 Mørkeleg (1996)
 Hotellet (2000–2001)
 Nikolaj og Julie (2002–2003)
 Se til venstre, der er en svensker (2003)
 May 33rd (2004)
 1066 The Battle for Middle Earth (2009)

External links

1972 births
Living people
Danish male stage actors
Danish male film actors
Danish male television actors
20th-century Danish male actors
21st-century Danish male actors